Healingbow is an EP by Eden. It was released in 1993 through Projekt Records.

Track listing

Personnel 
Eden
Pieter Bourke – percussion, keyboards, hammered dulcimer, programming
Sean Bowley – vocals, guitar, keyboards
Production and additional personnel
Don Bartley – mastering, engineering
Tim Blake – cello
Julia Bourke – photography, design
Adam Calaitzis – engineering
Julia Bourke – art direction, design
Eden – production
Vanessa Meckes – photography
Chris von Menge – photography
David Thrussell – additional drums on "Healingbow" and "Melancholia"
Brian Westbrook – cello

References 

1993 EPs
Eden (Australian band) albums
Projekt Records EPs